DeWees-Preston-Smith House was a historic home located at Terre Haute, Vigo County, Indiana. It was built between 1823 and 1826, and was a -story, vernacular Southern post-colonial style stone dwelling. It featured a full width verandah and a stuccoed front.  It was damaged by fire in 1979, and was the oldest remaining structure in Terre Haute. It has been demolished.

It was listed on the National Register of Historic Places in 1982 and delisted in 1989.

References

Former National Register of Historic Places in Indiana
Houses on the National Register of Historic Places in Indiana
Houses completed in 1826
Buildings and structures in Terre Haute, Indiana
National Register of Historic Places in Terre Haute, Indiana